Catlett House may refer to:

Catlett House (Catlettsburg, Kentucky), listed on the National Register of Historic Places in Boyd County, Kentucky
Catlett House (Staunton, Virginia), listed on the National Register of Historic Places in Staunton, Virginia